Conor Loftus (born 1995) is a Gaelic footballer who plays for Crossmolina Deel Rovers and the Mayo county team. He replaced Andy Moran as a substitute in the 2017 All-Ireland Senior Football Championship Final. He scored a goal against Derry in the 2017 All-Ireland Senior Football Championship qualifiers after coming on as a substitute in the 63rd minute.

References

1995 births
Living people
Crossmolina Gaelic footballers
DCU Gaelic footballers
Gaelic football forwards
Mayo inter-county Gaelic footballers